Franklin Américo de Meneses Dória, Baron of Loreto (1836-1906) was a Brazilian politician and poet, and a founding member of the Brazilian Academy of Letters. He was born on Ilha dos Frades, Itaparica, the son of José Inácio de Meneses Dória and Águeda Clementina de Meneses Dória. He studied Law in Recife, graduating in 1859. His contemporaries included Aristides Lobo, Gusmão Lobo and Joaquim Medeiros e Albuquerque, father of Medeiros e Albuquerque. In the same year of his graduation, at the age of 23, he published Enlevos, his only volume of poetry. Soon he abandoned verse. The only other poetic work he published afterwards was a translation of Evangelina by Longfellow.

He devoted himself to law and politics. As a lawyer, he defended important causes, for example, that of Judge Pontes Visgueiro, the accused in a famous crime in Maranhão. He exercised the functions of prosecutor, delegate and judge. In 1863, he was elected provincial deputy in Bahia. In 1864, he was named president of the Province of Piauí; in 1866, governor of Maranhão, and in 1880, governor of Pernambuco. He also served in the Federal Chamber in the 1870s and 1880s.

He was Minister of War in the Jose Antonio Saraiva cabinet of 1881, when, among other initiatives, he founded the Army Library. He was also Minister of the Empire in the last cabinet of the Monarchy, of the Viscount of Ouro Preto (1889). He received the title of Baron of Loreto in 1888. He was linked to the Imperial Family, accompanying them in exile after the abolition of the monarchy. Returning to Brazil, he devoted himself to law and literature. He was professor of literature at Colégio Pedro II. 

He was the first occupant of chair nº. 25 of the Brazilian Academy of Letters, whose patron was the poet Junqueira Freire, his childhood friend. He was also a member of the Brazilian Historical and Geographical Institute.

References

1836 births
1906 deaths
Brazilian politicians
Brazilian poets